John Matthews (1808–1870) was an English-born American inventor and soda water manufacturer. He is known as "The Soda Fountain King".

Matthews manufactured carbonating machinery and distributed his product through retail stores. The equipment was a lead-lined cast-iron box where carbonic acid gas was formed by mixing sulphuric acid with marble dust. The gas was then purified by passing it through water, and then into a tank partially filled with cool water. The tank was rocked for a quarter to a half hour, until the water was impregnated and bubbly.

Matthews created a fountain apparatus that could be positioned on a pharmacist's counter to dispense carbonated drinks, leading to its popularization and rapid growth.

He is buried at Green-Wood Cemetery, Brooklyn, New York. His monument was designed by Karl Muller and cost $30,000.  When it rains, excess water drains from the gargoyles' mouths.

See also
Soda fountain

External links
John Matthews - Father of the Soda Fountain by Donald Yates, published in Bottles and Extras, Summer 2006
The Soda Fountain by Joseph L Morrison

References

19th-century American inventors
1808 births
1870 deaths
Burials at Green-Wood Cemetery
English emigrants to the United States